Scribner's Monthly: An Illustrated Magazine for the People was an illustrated American literary periodical published from 1870 until 1881. Following a change in ownership in 1881 of the company that had produced it, the magazine was relaunched as The Century Magazine.

History
Charles Scribner I, Andrew Armstrong, Arthur Peabody, Edward Seymour, Josiah Gilbert Holland, and Roswell Smith established Scribner & Co. on July 19, 1870, to start on the publication of Scribner's Monthly. Scribner's Monthly absorbed the second incarnation of Putnam's Monthly Magazine of American Literature, Science and Art.

The first issue of the newly formed periodical was published in November of that year. In April 1881, Charles Scribner II sold his share of the Scribner & Co. company to Roswell Smith. The names of the magazine and the company were retooled, dropping mention of 'Scribner'; Scribner's Monthly was changed to The Century Magazine and Scribner & Co. was changed to Century Company.

Charles Scribner II was unable to launch a competing magazine for five years. In 1886, Scribner announced to a Times reporter that they would make a new monthly publication "as soon as the necessary arrangements could be perfected". Scribner also announced that the editor would be Edward Burlingame, the son of Anson Burlingame, who was already connected to the publishing house as a literary advisor.

Scribner further noted that the magazine would not be a revival of the formerly published Scribner's Monthly.

Contributors
Truman C. Everts's Thirty-Seven Days of Peril was also published within the pages of Scribner's Monthly.

Footnotes

Further reading
 Robert J. Scholnick, "Scribner's Monthly and the 'Pictorial Representation of Life and Truth' in Post-Civil War America", American Periodicals, vol. 1, no. 1 (Fall 1991), pp. 46–69. In JSTOR

External links

 
 Scribner's Monthly at Cornell University Library, vols. 1-5, 7-22 (1870–1881)
 Holland Collection of Literary Letters, University of Colorado Boulder

Magazines established in 1870
Magazines disestablished in 1881
Monthly magazines published in the United States
Defunct literary magazines published in the United States
1870 establishments in the United States
1881 disestablishments in the United States
Magazines published in New York City